Micropholis venamoensis is a species of plant in the family Sapotaceae. It is a leafy evergreen shrub that is endemic to Venezuela.  It has recently been placed on the list of threatened species.

References

venamoensis
Flora of Venezuela
Vulnerable plants
Taxonomy articles created by Polbot